George Short (born 5 May 1941) is a Canadian sprinter. He competed in the men's 100 metres at the 1960 Summer Olympics.

References

1941 births
Living people
Athletes (track and field) at the 1959 Pan American Games
Athletes (track and field) at the 1960 Summer Olympics
Canadian male sprinters
Olympic track and field athletes of Canada
Athletes from Saskatoon
Pan American Games track and field athletes for Canada